John Cust, 1st Earl Brownlow, GCH (19 August 1779 – 15 September 1853) was a British Peer and Tory politician.

Life

Cust was the eldest son of the 1st Baron Brownlow and his second wife, Frances. He was educated at Eton (1788–93) and Trinity College, Cambridge (1797) before undertaking a European tour of Russia and Germany in 1801. In 1802 he was elected the MP for Clitheroe, holding the seat until 1807, when he succeeded to his father's title and estates, including Belton House near Grantham, Lincolnshire.

In May 1805, he was elected a Fellow of the Royal Society. From 1809 to 1852, he was Lord Lieutenant of Lincolnshire and in 1815 was created Earl Brownlow and Viscount Alford, of Alford, in the County of Lincoln. He was appointed to the Royal Guelphic Order as a Knight Grand Cross (GCH) in 1834.

According to the Legacies of British Slave-Ownership at the University College London, Brownlow was awarded compensation under the Slave Compensation Act 1837. In 1821, Brownlow's younger brother, Sir Edward Cust, 1st Baronet (1794–1878), had married Mary Anne Boode (1799–1882). Mary was the daughter and heiress of Lewis William and Margaret Boode (née  Dannett). The Boodes were a prominent Dutch, slave owning family. Brownlow and Wilbraham Egerton of Tatton Park acted as co-trustees and executors of Margaret Boode's estate when she died in 1827.

Family
On 24 July 1810, Lord Brownlow married Sophia Hume, the second daughter and coheiress of Sir Abraham Hume, Bt., with whom he had three children:

 Lady Sophia Frances, (1811–1882) (allegedly a friend of Augustus Smith and a regular visitor to Tresco), married Lt-Col Christopher Tower. Mother of Amelia, Countess de Salis
 John Hume, Viscount Alford (1812–1851)
 Charles Henry (1813–1875)

Brownlow's wife died in 1814 and on 22 September 1818, he married Caroline Fludyer daughter of George Fludyer of Ayston, Rutland (and a granddaughter of Sir Samuel Fludyer, Bt). Brownlow and Caroline had four daughters:

 Lady Caroline Mary Cust, (1819–1898)
 Lady Amelia Cust, (1821–?)
 Lady Katherine Anne Cust, (1822–1885)
 Lady Elizabeth Cust, (1824–1824)

Caroline died in 1824 and Brownlow then married thirdly Lady Emma Sophia Edgcumbe, a daughter of the 2nd Earl of Mount Edgcumbe. Lord Brownlow did have not any children with his third wife.

As his eldest son had pre-deceased him in 1851, on his own death in 1853 his titles and estates passed to his grandson, John William Spencer Egerton-Cust

References

|-

1779 births
1853 deaths
People educated at Eton College
Alumni of Trinity College, Cambridge
Earls in the Peerage of the United Kingdom
Lord-Lieutenants of Lincolnshire
Cust, John
Cust, John
Cust, John
Brownlow, E1
UK MPs who were granted peerages
Tory MPs (pre-1834)
Fellows of the Royal Society
John
Recipients of payments from the Slavery Abolition Act 1833
British slave owners
Barons Brownlow